John Peter Bushemi (born April 13, 1948) is an American former politician from the state of Indiana. A Democrat, he served in the Indiana State Senate from 1976 to 1990. He is a lawyer.

Bushemi was born 13 April 1948 in Chicago, Illinois, the son of Samuel Joseph Bushemi. He is a nephew of Marion J. Bushemi and John A. Bushemi, and cousin of Victoria Caesar. Bushemi attended Indiana University Bloomington. He married Betty Ann Tiller on 26 September 1985.

References

Living people
1948 births
Politicians from Chicago
Politicians from Gary, Indiana
Indiana state senators